Freedom is a 2016 Ugandan drama film set in the pre-NRA war times and details the despicable abuse suffered by an unlucky Amelia (Nisha Kalema) at the hands of her adoptive father. The film was produced by Richard Mulindwa and screenplay by both Mulindwa and Nisha Kalema. After its release, the film dominated nominations and awards at the 2016 Uganda Film Festival Awards with nine nominations and six wins including Best Feature Film, Best Director, Best Actor (film) and Best Actress (film).

In Theatre
British producer and religious minister George Hargreaves premiered Freedom on stage in Europe in August 2017. It was staged at the Edinburgh Fringe Festival in Scotland and the Bernie Grant Arts Centre in London between August 15-26th that same year.

Controversy on Screenplay
Nisha Kalema who was the film's screenwriter lost her screen writing credits on the promotional posters, film’s DVD and theatre release, hence falling out with the producers of the film. She was however credited on IMDb for screenplay.

Awards & Nominations

References

External
 

Films set in Uganda
2016 films
Films shot in Uganda
English-language Ugandan films
2010s English-language films